Denver J. Stutler Jr. is an American engineer who served as the Secretary of the Florida Department of Transportation from June 2005 to December 2006 under then-Florida Governor Jeb Bush. Stutler previously served as Chief of Staff to Gov. Bush before becoming Secretary.

Stutler hired Stephanie Kopelousos as his chief of staff at FDOT; she later succeeded him as Secretary. After leaving government, he became CEO of P3 Development Company, LLC in Tallahassee, Florida. He is an alumnus of the University of Central Florida, graduating with a bachelor's degree in 1987, and a master's degree in civil engineering in 1989.

Currently, Stutler is the co-founder and CEO U.S. Submergent Technologies.

References

Living people
State cabinet secretaries of Florida
University of Central Florida alumni
1966 births
American civil engineers